Woodgate may refer to:

Locations
Woodgate, Birmingham, West Midlands, England
Woodgate, Cumbria, England
Woodgate, Devon, a location in England
Woodgate, Indiana, United States
Woodgate, Leicestershire, England
Woodgate, New York, United States
Woodgate, Norfolk, a location in England
Woodgate, Queensland, Australia
Woodgate, West Sussex, in Aldingbourne, England
Woodgate, Worcestershire, a location in England

People
Agustina Woodgate (born 1981), Argentinian artist
Clare Woodgate (born 1975), Birth name and original stage name of actress Georgina Cates
Daniel Woodgate (born 1960), Drummer of the band, Madness
Edward Woodgate (1845–1900), British general
Jonathan Woodgate (born 1980), English footballer
Leslie Woodgate (1900–1961), English choral conductor
Roberta Woodgate (born 1956), Canadian nurse and academic
Terry Woodgate (1919–1985), English footballer
Thomas Woodgate (1857–1929), English cricketer
Walter Bradford Woodgate, (1841–1920), British lawyer and oarsman